The Pacific Whale Foundation (PWF) is a non-governmental organization founded in 1980 and based in Maui, Hawaii that conducts whale research and educates the public in an effort to save vulnerable species of whales from extinction.  As of 2012 the organization had about 150 employees.

Since its foundation the PWF has been working to prevent destruction of populations of Humpback whales, dolphins, turtles and coral reefs in Hawaii.
Every year the PWF organizes a "Great Whale Count" where volunteers systematically gather data on whales that can be seen from ten observation points along the southern shore of Maui, giving a series of snapshots that indicate changes in whale populations.
The Pacific Whale Foundation provided funding to the Alfaguara project on Isla de Chiloé in southern Chile for marine surveys of the local blue whale population in the 2012 season.

The PWF also has a second home in Hervey Bay, Queensland, Australia.

References

Whale conservation
Cetaceans of the Pacific Ocean
Animal charities based in the United States
Environmental organizations based in Hawaii
Environmental organizations established in 1980
1980 establishments in Hawaii
1980 establishments in the United States